Han Xuan ( 200s–210) was a government official who lived during the late Eastern Han dynasty of China. He served as the Administrator of Changsha Commandery (長沙郡; around present-day Changsha, Hunan). After Liu Biao's death in 208, the northern part of Jing Province was divided between two of Liu Biao's sons, Liu Qi and Liu Cong. The commanderies in southern Jing Province were ruled by their respective Administrators: Zhao Fan, Jin Xuan, Liu Du and Han Xuan. In 209, Liu Bei attacked the four southern Jing commanderies, and all four Administrators surrendered.

In Romance of the Three Kingdoms

See also
 Lists of people of the Three Kingdoms

References

 Chen, Shou (3rd century). Records of the Three Kingdoms (Sanguozhi).
 Luo, Guanzhong (14th century). Romance of the Three Kingdoms (Sanguo Yanyi).
 Pei, Songzhi (5th century). Annotations to Records of the Three Kingdoms (Sanguozhi zhu).

2nd-century births
Year of death unknown
Han dynasty warlords
Liu Biao and associates
Political office-holders in Hunan